Safari Skyway was a monorail ride that opened in 1986 at Chessington World of Adventures Resort, in the Market Square area (Now called Adventure Point). Manufactured by Mack Rides, the ride gave guests a guided tour of Chessington Zoo, and in its first year, the construction of Chessington World of Adventures theme park. The ride ran for almost thirty years before closing abruptly in late July 2015. In early January 2016, the park announced that the ride would be retired due to continuous troubles with maintenance for the ride.

History

Safari Skyway was opened in 1986, as one of the first rides to open at Chessington World of Adventures. Safari Skyway's entrance was towards the back of the Market Square area, and the monorail gave a guided tour of the zoo, lawn and mansion area. In later years of the ride's operation, maintenance of the aging monorail system became difficult, and it suffered frequent breakdowns, including an incident in 2009 when a park-wide power cut stranded the monorail cars mid-route, forcing those inside to be rescued by a cherry picker.

Description
The ride took approximately 8 minutes, and the maximum height restriction for riders was 1.96 meters. Riders under 1.1 meters had to be accompanied by someone 16 or over. The ride passed such features in Chessington Zoo, such as Sea Lion Bay, Amazu, Trail of the Kings and other areas. It first passed the smaller animals in the Children's Zoo, before going behind the Sea Life Centre and near to the Lodge Gate entrance. The ride continued passing nearby (but not directly above) the gorillas, lions and sea lions before returning to the station via the theme park.

Gallery

See also

Chessington World of Adventures

References

External links

Chessington World of Adventures rides
Tourist attractions in London
1986 establishments in the United Kingdom
2015 disestablishments in the United Kingdom
Monorails in the United Kingdom
Amusement rides manufactured by Mack Rides